Canisteo Peninsula is an ice-covered peninsula, about  long and  wide, which projects between Ferrero Bay and Cranton Bay into the eastern extremity of the Amundsen Sea. It was delineated from air photos taken by U.S. Navy Operation Highjump in December 1946, and named by the Advisory Committee on Antarctic Names for the USS Canisteo, a tanker with the eastern task group of this expedition.

Further reading 
 Defense Mapping Agency 1992, Sailing Directions (planning Guide) and (enroute) for Antarctica, P 277
 Herzfeld U.C. (2004), Detailed Studies of Selected Antarctic Outlet Glaciers and Ice Shelves, In: Atlas of Antarctica. Springer, Berlin, Heidelberg, https://doi.org/10.1007/978-3-642-18515-1_6

References 
 

Peninsulas of Ellsworth Land
Canisteo, New York